Spathodus marlieri is a species of cichlid endemic to Lake Tanganyika where it is only known from the northern portion of the lake. This species can reach a length of  TL. It can also be found in the aquarium trade. The specific name honours the Belgian zoologist Georges Marlier.

References

External links 
 Photograph

marlieri
Taxa named by Max Poll
Fish described in 1950
Taxonomy articles created by Polbot